G. sylvestre may refer to:
 Galium sylvestre, a synonym for Galium album, a plant species native to Europe
 Gymnema sylvestre, a herb species native to the tropical forests of southern and central India

See also
 Sylvestre (disambiguation)